were a series of surface-to-air anti-aircraft missiles developed in Japan at the end of the Second World War. The missile's development in the late stages of the war was plagued by organisational problems and cancelled before becoming operational.

In 1945, a few samples of SAM Funryu were created and tested, but due to the surrender of the Japanese Empire, had not been finalized. All the developments on the complex were destroyed after the end of hostilities.

The first design was the Funryu 1 and it was an air-to-surface missile (ASM) whose specific role was anti-shipping. Funryu 1 was much like a miniature airplane. The warhead contained  of explosive and guidance was via radio control. Testing of the Funryu 1 was conducted with the missile being dropped from a modified Mitsubishi G4M bomber. However, since it would require a significant amount of time to effectively control the missile in flight and with the increase of US bombing raids against Japan, it was decided that efforts should be directed towards surface-to-air missiles (SAMs). Thus, the Funryu 1 was shelved and became the only ASM of the Funryu family.

Two more advanced versions were called the Funryu 2 and the Funryu 4.

Funryu 4, which strongly resembled the Mitsubishi J8M (with swept wings and elevons) would be guided primarily by radio control from the ground. The operator would fly the Primary version of missile Funryu 2 into the vicinity of the bombers, then cut the engine and let it glide. Funryu 4 were high-speed designs that could be flown directly at their target along the line of sight, easy enough to do even from the ground.

Since the thrust of the engine is less than the starting weight of the rocket, the launch was supposed to carry out a 45° angle to the horizon, and to a great extent climb had to rely on aerodynamic forces.

The control system has radio command to the original single-channel transmission system commands. Basic pulse signal frequency was 1 kHz, with a division into groups. After every 200 pulses there is a brief pause. The combination of these five groups according to the duration of pulses and 200 was set commands: up, down, right, left, and explosion. Target-tracking and missile guidance were intended to be carried out visually, by optical means, as well as by radar. The team at undermining the projectile was issued automatically when the radar signal reflected from the target coincided with the signal reflected from the SAM. Such a control system, in the main, matches some modern systems.

In accordance with this project, bench tests for a prototype "Funryu 4" rockets began (and then ended) August 16, 1945 in the arsenal of Nagasaki, on the day after the end of hostilities.

Shortly thereafter, soldiers dynamited all equipment associated with the program "Funryu" so nothing associated with these missiles would get into American hands.

See also 
 Enzian
 Wasserfall
 Feuerlilie
 Rheintochter
 Ke-Go
 Kawasaki Ki-147 I-Go Type1 – Ko
 Kawasaki Ki-148

References

External links
 The rocket: The history and development of rocket & missile technology, David Baker
 FUNRYU

World War II guided missiles
Surface-to-air missiles of Japan
20th-century surface-to-air missiles